Ivan Trendafilov was a Bulgarian footballer. He played in three matches for the Bulgaria national football team in 1950. He was also part of Bulgaria's squad for the 1952 Summer Olympics, but he did not play in any matches.

References

External links
 

Year of birth missing
Possibly living people
Bulgarian footballers
Bulgaria international footballers
Place of birth missing (living people)
Association football forwards